Historic Barns of Connecticut is a Connecticut Trust for Historic Preservation project dedicated to the documention and preservation of barns.  The program includes a grant program and a database. The project began listing barns in 2004. By June 2011 8,200 barns had been documented in Connecticut, said project director Todd Levine. "The first step in preservation is documentation, so we need to know what we are losing to know what we need to do to protect them".

More than 2,000 selected barns have been researched and documented as part of an ongoing Historic Resource Inventory, searchable on the project's website.

In 2011 and 2012, 200 significant barns (not already identified in existing historic districts) will be chosen for in-depth research and nomination to the State Register of Historic Places.

References

External links
Project website

Non-profit organizations based in Connecticut